The 1971 National Soccer League season was the forty-eighth season under the National Soccer League (NSL) name. The season began in early May and concluded in October with the Canadian Open Cup final where Toronto Croatia defeated Challenge Trophy champions Vancouver Eintracht. The Croatians would secure a treble by successfully defending their regular-season title, and defeating Toronto First Portuguese for the NSL Championship. The NSL Cup was successfully defended by Toronto First Portuguese who defeated Sudbury City. 

The Canadian Open Cup was created by the NSL to determine a national champion through an annual knock-out cup competition where all professional and amateur Canadian clubs were invited to participate.

Overview  
The National Soccer League became centered once more within the boundaries of Ontario after the departure of Soccer Portugais du Quebec of Montreal. Northern Ontario was added to the circuit once again as Sudbury Italia returned under the name Sudbury City.  The league expanded into the Niagara region for the first time as St. Catharines Heidelberg was granted a franchise. Heidelberg previously competed in the Inter-City Soccer League. Ottawa Sons of Italy began a process of Canadianizing their organization by renaming the team Ottawa Tigers.  

The NSL experienced competition from the American-based North American Soccer League as it expanded into Ontario with the creation of the Toronto Metros. The league's match attendance continued to surge and surpassed the previous season's gate earnings at Stanley Park Stadium. The Toronto-based teams averaged around 1100 fans at Stanley Park. The league ownership also approved the creation of an under-23 division.

Teams

Standings

Playoffs

Quarterfinals

Semifinals

Finals

Cup  
The cup tournament was a separate contest from the rest of the season, in which all fourteen teams took part. The tournament would conclude in a final match for the Cup.

Semifinals

Finals

Canadian Open Cup 
The Canadian Open Cup was a tournament organized by the National Soccer League in 1971 where the NSL champion would face the Challenge Trophy winners to determine the best team throughout the country. The tournament intended to form an annual knock-out cup competition open to all Canadian professional and amateur clubs to determine a national champion. The championship was initially sponsored by the Macdonald Tobacco Company and was named the Export Trophy. Toronto Croatia as the NSL champions was selected as the league's representative while their opponents were Vancouver Eintracht of the Pacific Coast Soccer League, who were the Challenge Trophy titleholders.

Individual awards 
The NSL awards were given to recipients from St. Catharines Heidelberg, Sudbury City, and Toronto Croatia. The most gentlemanly team award was given to St. Catharines, and league official John Parfect received the most dedicated official award. Željko Bilecki of Toronto Croatia was named the goalkeeper of the year, and would later represent the Canada national team and play in the North American Soccer League. The league's top goal scorer was Sudbury's Ferruccio Deni, and he later returned to the NSL to play with the Sudbury Cyclones. The final award went to Hugh Morrow as the top referee throughout the season.

References

External links
RSSSF CNSL page
thecnsl.com - 1971 season

1971–72 domestic association football leagues
National Soccer League
1971